William Moses Annyas Eanes was an Irish politician who in 1555  was elected mayor of Youghal in County Cork. He was the first Jew to hold such an elected position in Ireland. His grandfather was a Marrano Jew who had emigrated from Belmonte, Portugal.

References

Mayors of places in Ireland
Jewish Irish politicians
People from Youghal
Irish people of Portuguese descent
European Sephardi Jews
People of Portuguese-Jewish descent
People of Elizabethan Ireland
Year of birth unknown
Year of death unknown
People from Belmonte, Portugal